In poultry farming, in-ovo sexing is a chick sexing method carried out while chicks are still in ovo (Latin for "inside the egg"). There are various methods to determine a chick's sex in the 21-day incubation period before it hatches (born by emerging from its eggshell).

In-ovo sexing technology has branched into two categories, invasive and non-invasive. The first invasive technology to be successfully commercially introduced for poultry farming was bio-market detection through the Dutch–German company Seleggt in November 2018. Meanwhile, the non-invasive in-ovo sexing technologies have been introduced to the market by the German start-up Orbem and AAT, a subsidiary of the EW Group.

History

Background 

The present-day ethical problem with egg production is chick culling of one-day-old male chicks, millions of male chicks that are killed as part of the production process. At the day the chicks hatch from their eggs the chicks are sexed. During chick sexing the day-old chicks are divided into male and female groups. Female chicks can be raised to become egg-laying hens, or broilers fed to be slaughtered for meat, both for human consumption; after the sexing, these female chicks are transported to the rearing farms where they are housed before they go to a laying hen farm or broiler farm. On the other hand, the male chicks are deemed to have much less economic value, as they cannot lay eggs and are usually less suited for meat production; most male chicks are therefore culled on the day they hatch after they have been sexed as male.

Innovation in the poultry sector 
In-ovo gender determination has the potential to bring an end to the killing of billions of male chicks. It is estimated that yearly around 7 billion day-old male chicks are killed. Implementing in-ovo sexing into the poultry industry results in a more animal friendly and more sustainable production. More animal friendly because the day-old male chicks no longer need to be culled, and more sustainable because less energy is used because only the female eggs need to be further incubated after sexing. The male eggs are sorted out and can be used for different purposes such as an alternative high-value protein source.

Male-chick culling ban 
In January 2021, Germany was the first country to successfully outlaw the practice. A few months later, France also banned the one-day-old male chick slaughter.  In 2022, the third country, Italy, followed the same steps, prohibiting the practice by 2026.

The discussion has risen around who would be the next country to stop the cruel procedure. Since 2021 the U.S. has been urged to attend the activists’ lobbying that has been done for decades, but so far no progress has been made.

Early technological breakthroughs

Academic research 
For a long time, it was held impossible to determine the sex of the hatching egg before or during the hatching process. The poultry sector has been working on this for years in order to be able to phase out chick culling in the interest of animal welfare.

Research has been conducted to achieve this goal. The first study on the matter, was published in 2013, for in-ovo sexing on day 9 of incubation. The researched procedure, later called bio-marker detection, used a hormonal test for the allantoic fluid of brown layers’ eggs. Further research was done by Prof. Dr. Einspanier following the same methodology. It is important to mention that hatcheability is affected by this in-ovo sexing method, as reported by Dr. Einspeiner.

n 2016, the fluorescence spectroscopy methodology[] was developed, it analyzes the extraembryonic blood to determine the sex of the embryo through its blood wavelength. The supervised egg classification by a PC with a 93% error rate was able to determine the sex of 380 eggs at 3.5 incubation day.  A variation of this methodology was explored in 2017. When the pattern analysis in hypersepctral images methodology was researched. First, the eggs would be candled with halogen lamps. Then, a hyperspectral camera would collect the transmitted light and the eggs would be classified using a linear discriminant analysis. This methodology could perform in-ovo sexing from 11-day up to 14-day embryos with a 97% accuracy.

2019 a new methodology was developed, AI-powered imaging. By combining AI and MRI together to perform in-ovo sexing of 12-day-old eggs with 95% accuracy level. Since 2007 MRI was used as a valuable tool for studying egg development in a contactless manner. Yet it would not be until it was combined with AI that it could be used for large-scale purposes.

First commercial application 
In 2018 Seleggt was the first company to succeed in commercial in-ovo sexing. Seleggt managed to sex the hatching eggs on day 9 of the incubation process with a hormone test. The method is based on the fundamental research of Prof. Dr. Einspanier at Leipzig University. From 8 November 2018, consumption eggs that are laid by the hens that have been sexed with the Seleggt method are to be found on the shelves of the German supermarket REWE, in the Berlin region. The eggs that have been sexed with the Seleggt method are sold under the label "Respeggt". This label guarantees the promise "Free of chick culling". Since 2018, Respeggt eggs have been available in Germany, France, and the Netherlands.

From then on more companies have followed and thrived, implementing different methodologies and technologies for in-ovo sexing. Their descriptions will be added below.

Sex determination methods 
The in-ovo sexing technologies have evolved into two main categories: invasive and non-invasive. An invasive technology is any technology that creates damage to the egg through intrusive sampling ans biochemical analysis for the in-ovo sexing process. Examples of these are biomarker detection, PCR, spectroscopy,  and endocrine method. The main drawbacks of invasive procedures is that, they may affect the eggs’ hatcheability   and that the process implies a risk for bacterial infection. On the other hand, non-invasive technologies, have a contactless in-ovo sexing procedure (e.g. AI-powered imaging) are free of this previous risks.

Invasive Technologies 

 Bio-marker detection (Seleggt, In Ovo)

The Dutch–German company Seleggt measures a substance that is a 'biomarker' for the sex through a small hole in the eggshell on day 9 after fertilisation. Mixed with fluid from fertilised eggs, this marker changes blue for a male and white for a female, with a 98.5% accuracy rate. As of May 2019, Seleggt sexed one egg per second (3,600 an hour) and thus enabled 30,000 'no-kill' female chicks to hatch in Germany every week. The German Federal Ministry of Food and Agriculture (BMEL) has invested 5 million euros in the development of the Seleggt technology.

Another Dutch company is In Ovo, a spin-off of Leiden University, Netherlands. This company was founded in 2013 by students Wouter Bruins (biology) and Wil Stutterheim (biomedical sciences) and, just like Seleggt, uses a small amount of liquid from the hatching egg and determines whether it is a male or female hatching egg by means of biomarker detection on the 9th day. By January 2020, In Ovo was capable of sexing 1,500 eggs an hour (0.42 per second), but the Dutch poultry sector required 40,000 eggs an hour, so further innovation was necessary. In Ovo received millions of euros in research investments, mostly from German chemicals company Evonik, Singaporese venture capital company Visvires New Protein, and Rabobank Leiden-Katwijk.

 PCR (Plantegg)

The German company Plantegg uses a PCR method, which uses DNA to determine whether the hatching egg is male or female. Like In Ovo and Seleggt, this method determines the sex on day 9 of the incubation process. This method is expected to be ready for use by the end of 2020.

Non-invasive technologies 

 Spectroscopy (AAT, Projet Soo, Hypereye)

Another German company, Agri Advanced Technologies (AAT), uses spectroscopy to determine the sex of the egg. The hatching egg is examined with by light beam, with a hyperspectral measuring technology the sex is determined on the basis of the calculated light spectrum. This method works for brown hatching eggs and can take place from the 13th day of the hatching process. AAT's goal is to eventually be able to sex eggs at the 4th day. The German Agriculture Ministry has also invested in AAT's technological development.

The French company Tronico, based in La Roche-sur-Yon, collaborates with the French National Centre for Scientific Research (CNRS) on Projet Soo, which employs a mix of spectroscopy and the use of biosensors with the target of achieving 90% accuracy in ovo sexing at 9 days of incubation by the end of 2019. In 2017, French Agriculture Minister Stéphane Le Foll granted Projet Soo 4.3 million euros to finance its egg sexing research.

Hypereye is a Canadian spectroscopic technology that is being developed by the Egg Research Development Foundation (ERDF), initially funded by Poultry Industry Council in Ontario and later by Egg Farmers of Ontario (EFO). It aims to achieve a 99% accuracy rate and to process 30,000–50,000 eggs per hour (8.3–13.9 eggs per second). In 2018, Canadian Agriculture Minister Lawrence MacAulay announced an $844,000 investment in the research project to stimulate its development.

Ai-powered imaging (Orbem) 
Based on years of scientific research at the interface of AI, imaging technology and embryonic poultry development, Orbem was founded in 2019 as a spin-off from the Technical University of Munich.  Orbem uses AI-powered MRI to conduct in-ovo sexing on day 12 - 13 of incubation, with a throughput of up to 24,000 eggs per hour. The solution applies equally to brown and white eggs. The solution is contactless and has no effect on the hatchability rate.

Two installations with a capacity of 6,000 and 12,000 eggs per hour will be fully operational at two French locations in January 2023 in line with French regulatory requirements. Orbem has entered a strategic partnership with the Vencomatic Group (NL) for end-to-end automation of the process, which includes financing facilitated by the Vencomatic Group of up to 15 Million Euros for equipment to be deployed at customer sites throughout Europe. This allows hatcheries to use the combined solution without any upfront investment just based on a performance fee per egg.

Alternative: male broilers 
Another alternative to preventing chick kills is fattening rooster chickens, which is what the Dutch company Kipster does. Hens and roosters are separated in the hatchery as usual. The cocks then go to a Kipster broiler farm where the cocks are fed and slaughtered when they reach their target weight.

References 

Bird anatomy
Poultry farming